The following is a list of Christmas television specials and miniseries, as well as Christmas-themed episodes of regular television series.

Australia

Brazil

Canada

Episodes

6teen

The Beachcombers

Corner Gas

Degrassi

The Forest Rangers

Hangin' In

My Little Pony: Friendship is Magic

The Red Green Show

Total Drama

Other Canadian shows

Specials

Germany

Episodes

Meister Eder und sein Pumuckl

Other German shows

Hungary

Cartoon

Sitcom

Soap opera

Iceland

Christmas calendar series (Jóladagatal Sjónvarpsins)

Notes: Prior to 1990, RÚV did not produce and air any Christmas calendar series. In 1994, 2010–2011, 2013–present RÚV only aired Scandinavian produced Christmas calendar series.

LazyTown

Ireland

The Podge and Rodge Show

Other Irish series

Japan

Anime

B Gata H Kei

Cardcaptor Sakura

Mermaid Melody Pichi Pichi Pitch

Hamtaro

Hetalia

Pokémon

Powerpuff Girls Z

Pretty Cure

Digimon

Doraemon

Ranma ½

Ojamajo Doremi

Toradora

The Disastrous Life of Saiki K.

Gintama

Jewelpet

Sgt. Frog

Tokusatsu

Ultra Series

Kamen Rider

Super Sentai

Metal Hero

Rankin/Bass

MOM Productions/Video Tokyo Productions

Television Corporation of Japan (TCJ)

Mushi Production

Topcraft/Pacific Animation Corporation (PAC)

Note: All Rankin/Bass Christmas specials were written and designed in the United States, and then animated in Japan; both in the stop-motion "Animagic" and traditional animation. Some of the holiday classics aired on television networks and were also available on VHS tapes, LaserDiscs, DVDs and Blu-ray Discs in Japan every Christmas season, like Rudolph the Red-Nosed Reindeer, which aired on the NHK network in 1967.

Norway

Christmas calendar series

NRK

TV 2
 1994: The Julekalender
 1995: Julefergå
 1996: The Julekalender
 1998: Julefergå
 2000: Vazelina Hjulkalender
 2001: Olsenbandens første kupp
 2002: Vazelina Hjulkalender
 2003: The Julekalender
 2004: Olsenbandens første kupp
 2005: Vazelina hjulkalender
 2006: Jul i Valhall
 2007: Olsenbandens første kupp
 2008: The Julekalender
 2009: Vazelina Hjulkalender
 2010: Olsenbanden Jr's Første Kupp

TVNorge
 2001: Nissene på låven
 2003: Nissene på låven
 2004: Ungkarsnissen
 2005: Nissene på låven
 2006: Jul i Tøyengata
 2007: Nissene på låven
 2009: Jul i Tøyengata
 2010: Den unge Fleksnes (På MAX sendes Nissene på låven)
 2011: "Nissene over skog og hei"
 2012: Nissene på låven

TV3
 2005: Tjuefjerde

Sweden
SVT's Christmas calendar, a new series every year since 1960, broadcast daily on 1–24 December
Sagan om Karl-Bertil Jonssons julafton (Christopher's Christmas Mission) (1975)
Svensson, Svensson Christmas Special (Svensson firar jul) (Season 1, Episode 7, 1994)

United Kingdom

United States

Other countries
Living with Lydia: Merry Christmas Lydia (2004) - Singapore
 A.T.O.M.: Enter the Dragon (2005) - France 
 Pucca: Pucca Claus Part 1: 'Tis the season for REVENGE!/Pucca Claus Part 2: Northern Lights Out/Pucca Claus Part 3: Secret Santa (2006) - South Korea
 The Haunted House Christmas Special: Grandma's Wish, Wheat Donggwi from North Korea (신비아파트 크리스마스 특별편: 할머니의 소원, 북에서 온 밀동귀) (2020) - South Korea
 Charlie's Christmas (L'Enfant au grelot) (1998) - France
 The Crumpets: Joyeux Noël et Bonne Année (2017) - France
 Santa's Christmas Snooze (Le Père Noël et le magicien) (1995) - France
 ABS-CBN Christmas specials (1992, 1996–ongoing) - Philippines

See also
 Christmas in the media
 Nordic Christmas calendar
 List of A Christmas Carol adaptations
 List of theatrical Christmas films
 List of made-for-television and direct-to-video Christmas films
 Christmas music
 Santa Claus in film
 List of Halloween television specials
 List of St. Patrick's Day television specials
 List of Thanksgiving television specials
 List of Easter television episodes
 List of Valentine's Day television specials

References

 
 
Television specials
Christmas
Lists of television specials